Henry Ciuci (April 25, 1903 – January 1986) was an American professional golfer. He won six official PGA Tour events in the late 1920s and early 1930s, and was one of the Tour's most successful performers between 1928 and 1931.

His best finish in a major championship was a tie for fifth place in the 1924 PGA Championship. His best effort in the U.S. Open was a sixth place tie in 1928. He finished T25 in the 1934 Masters Tournament.

Golf career
Ciuci won two Tour events in 1928, and scored two second-place finishes. He had 11 finishes in the top-10 and 15 in the top-25 that season. In 1929, he won one Tour event, finished third three times, had eight finishes in the top-10 and 17 in the top-25. He had his best season in 1931, winning three times, one of which was the inaugural Connecticut Open. Also in 1931, he finished third twice, had eight finishes in the top-10 and 10 in the top-25. For his career, in addition to the six wins, Ciuci is credited with 53 top-10 finishes and 85 finishes in the top-25.

PGA Tour wins (6)
1928 (2) Florida Open, one other win
1929 (1) one win
1931 (3) Fort Lauderdale Open, Coral Gables Open (tie with Walter Hagen), Connecticut Open

Source:

Results in major championships

Note: Ciuci never played in The Open Championship.

NYF = Tournament not yet founded
WD = Withdrew
CUT = missed the half-way cut
R64, R32, R16, QF, SF = Round in which player lost in PGA Championship match play
"T" indicates a tie for a place

References

American male golfers
PGA Tour golfers
Golfers from New York (state)
1903 births
1986 deaths